Avianna Chao (born May 3, 1975) is a Chinese-born Canadian sport shooter. She is a gold medalist in the sport pistol at the 2007 Pan American Games in Rio de Janeiro, Brazil.

Shooting career
Chao, a native of Wuhan, China, emigrated to Canada at the age of eleven. Her mother Lien Chao is a graduate of Canadian literature and English language at York University in Toronto, and also, a popular poet and author for numerous literary works, including The Maples and the Stream and The Chinese Knot.

Chao started out her shooting career in 2001 to support her fiance Patrick Haynes (now working as her personal coach), who was trying out for the national team. She claimed numerous shooting titles at the Canadian national championships, and consequently, achieved a fourth-place finish in the women's sport pistol at the 2003 Pan American Games in Santo Domingo, Dominican Republic, with a score of 666.8 points. She also captured a bronze medal in the pistol shooting pairs, along with her partner Kim Eagles, at the 2006 Commonwealth Games in Melbourne, Australia, posting a combined score of 1,130 points.

In 2007, Chao reached her breakthrough season in shooting, when she won a gold medal for the women's air pistol (AP40) at the Pan American Games in Rio de Janeiro, Brazil, accumulating a score of 468.9 targets (372 in the preliminary rounds and 96.9 in the final). Following her success from these games, Chao earned a spot on the Canadian shooting team for the Olympics.

At the 2008 Summer Olympics in Beijing, Chao competed only in two pistol shooting events. She placed thirty-ninth out of forty-four shooters in the women's 10 m air pistol, with a total score of 370 points. Three days later, Chao competed for her second event, 25 m pistol, where she was able to shoot 277 targets in the precision stage, and 281 in the rapid fire, for a total score of 558 points, finishing only in forty-first place.

References

External links
Profile – Canadian Olympic Team
NBC Olympics Profile

Canadian female sport shooters
Living people
Olympic shooters of Canada
Shooters at the 2003 Pan American Games
Shooters at the 2006 Commonwealth Games
Shooters at the 2007 Pan American Games
Shooters at the 2008 Summer Olympics
Chinese emigrants to Canada
Sportspeople from Toronto
Sportspeople from Wuhan
1975 births
Chinese female sport shooters
Pan American Games gold medalists for Canada
Commonwealth Games medallists in shooting
Commonwealth Games bronze medallists for Canada
Pan American Games medalists in shooting
Sport shooters from Hubei
Medalists at the 2007 Pan American Games
Medallists at the 2006 Commonwealth Games